is one of the 16 wards in the city of Nagoya in Aichi Prefecture, Japan. As of 1 October 2019, the ward has an estimated population of 150,480 and a population density of 8,393 persons per km². The total area is 17.93 km².

Geography
The ward is located in the northwestern part of the city. The Shōnai River runs through the ward, as do the Hori River and Shin River.

History
The ward was established in 1908.

Nishi-Ward is the birthplace of pachinko.

Companies
The food companies Marukawa, Kasugai, and Meito Sangyo are located in this ward.

The Hotel Nagoya Castle is located there.

Attractions
The small historical street Shike-michi runs parallel to the Hori Canal. It was used by merchants during the Edo period and is now a historical property.

A museum of the ceramic maker Noritake and the company's headquarters are located in Nishi Ward, and nearby is also the Toyota Commemorative Museum of Industry and Technology.

A popular park are the Shōnai Greens.

The Nagoya Lucent Tower, one of the tallest buildings in Nagoya, is located in the ward.

Notable persons 
Niwa Nagahide – samurai
Sassa Narimasa – samurai

References

External links